Algerian literature has been influenced by many cultures, including the ancient Romans, Arabs, French, Spanish, and Berbers. The dominant languages in Algerian literature are French and Arabic.

A few of the more notable Algerian writers are: Kateb Yacine, Rachid Mimouni, Mouloud Mammeri, Mouloud Feraoun, Assia Djebar and Mohammed Dib.

History
The historic roots of Algerian literature trace back to the Numidian era, when Apuleius wrote The Golden Ass, the only Latin novel to survive in its entirety. Augustine of Hippo, Nonius Marcellus and Martianus Capella, among others, also wrote in this period. The Middle Ages also saw many Arabic writers revolutionize the Arab world literature with authors like Ahmad al-Buni and Ibn Manzur and Ibn Khaldoun, who wrote the Muqaddimah while staying in Algeria. During the rule of the Ottoman Empire, Algerian literature remained in Arabic, mainly in the style of short stories and poetry. In the 19th century, with the beginning of French colonialism, most Algerian literature transition into French, and few Arabic works were written until post-independence in 1962.

Literature in French
French literature in Algeria can be critically grouped into three main periods: first, assimilation from the beginning of the colonial period to 1945; second, decolonization from 1945 to 1962; and third, social critique from 1962 to present.

Up to 1945
Because of the colonial regime, this 1st literature appears at first to be in support of the French colonial regime, but they still explored themes about the difficulty of assimilation into French culture and the rifts between generations that these colonial changes caused. Some scholars continue to consider these works problematic in their acquiescence to French colonialism while other critics find a veiled critique of colonialism throughout these works in the form of allusions and double-entendre.

Algerianism was a literary genre with political overtones, born among French Algerian writers who hoped for a common Algerian future culture, uniting French settlers and native Algerians. The terme algérianiste was used for the first time in a 1911 novel by Robert Randau, "Les Algérianistes". A Cercle algérianiste was created in France in 1973 by Pieds-Noirs, with several local chapters. It has for "purpose to safeguard the cultural heritage born from the French presence in Algeria."

Many scholars consider M’Hamed Ben Rahal's La vengeance du cheikh (The Cheikh's Vengeance) in 1891 to be the first work of fiction in French by an Algerian author. Others notable works in the same period include Mustapha Allaoua's Le Faux talisman (The False Talisman) and Omar Samar's Ali, O mon frère (Ali, O My Brother) in 1893.

1945–1962
The second phase of Algerian francophone literature began as political tensions rose in the nation, and the War of Independence began. Most Algerian authors of this period were staunch supporters of the FLN and of an independent Algeria, so much so that many literary figures at the time were active participants in the independence struggle. Countless such writers, including Kateb Yacine, Mohamed Boudia, Anna Gréki, and Leila Djabali, were arrested and imprisoned by the colonial regime during the 1950s. In contrast with their pre-1945 counterparts, these writers were more vocally critical of France in their work and used a realistic style to highlight the injustices of colonialism. Notable works from this period include Feraoun's Le Fils du pauvre (The Poor Man's Son), Mohammed Dib’s La Grande maison (The Big House), Mouloud Mammeri’s La Colline oubliée (The Forgotten Hill), Kateb Yacine’s Ndjema, and Malek Haddad’s La Dernière impression (The Last Impression).

Albert Camus, a French-Algerian (or pied noir), is undoubtedly the best known French writer ever to come from Algeria. A philosopher, novelist, and playwright, Camus won the Nobel Prize for Literature in 1957. While most of his stories are set in Algeria and he supported civil rights for the indigenous Algerians, he opposed Algerian independence, which has hurt his reputation in his homeland.

1962–Present
The third period of Algerian Francophone literature includes writing about the War of Independence, but also critiquing elements of Algerian tradition. These works focus on issues of urbanism, bureaucracy, religious intolerance and patriarchy. Similar to their varied topics, these works vary in style from Realism, to Postmodernism. These authors include Rachid Boudjedra, Rachid Mimouni, Leila Sebbar, Tahar Djaout and Tahir Wattar. Leila Sebbar's Shérazade, Shérazade, 17 ans, brune, frisée, les yeux verts trilogy explored the point of view of a second generation Algerian. It tackled new social and cultural situations such as the difficult reconstruction of identity in a country torn apart by its history. As Karina Eileraas puts it in "Reframing the Colonial Gaze: Photography, Ownership, and Feminist Resistance": Sherazade is a victim of her "persistent inability to access the past" which "traumatizes her life as a Maghrebian immigrant in France, and precludes successful mourning". Leila Sebbar's book explores the subject of identity and cultural hybridity with the use of intertextual and artistic references.  In her book, Sherazade is able to mourn her lost homeland through the photographs of the French photographer Marc Garanger. As Karina Eileraas develops, his photographs "equip Sherazade with a supplemental shortcut to the past, the allow her to temporarily mourn her (lack of) Algeria".

Current Algerian literature can be loosely divided into two groups. The first group is strongly influenced by terrorism that occurred in the 1990s. The second group focuses on an individualistic conception of human adventure. Recent notable works include Swallows of Kabul and The Attack by Yasmina Khadra, Memory in the Flesh (originally in Arabic) by Ahlam Mosteghanemi and Nowhere In My Father's House by Assia Djebar.

Literature in Arabic

Poetry
The earliest Algerian literature written in Arabic consisted of poetry in classical or semi-classical Arabic dating back to the 8th century. After the initial wave of Arabic works created during the first arrival of Arabic speaking people from the Middle East in the Maghreb, classical Arabic poetry in Algeria hit a lull stretching from 1492 to the 1920s. However, this time saw a flourishing body of poetry written in Algerian Arabic with a semi-classical form. The classical Arabic poetry that resurfaced in the 20s, 30s, and 40s mainly focused on religious values and were written in a classic style. A good example of this classic style is Mohamed Saïd El-Zahiri's “Greeting of the Oulémas.” This excerpt shows the characteristic religious themes:
Numerous were the brotherhoods, each 
obeying its sheikh in everything he declared. 
If he pretended to be holy, they acquiesced, 
and, if he claimed divinity, they cried: prince of the inspired!... 
 

During the War of Independence, most of the Arabic poetry in Algeria was written in Free verse. This poetry was both emotional and combative, akin to Romanticism. Post-independence poetry became more innovative in style, and focused on a broader range of topics, much like its prose counterpart. This type of poetry, with varied themes and structures, can be exemplified by an excerpt from Mabrouka Boussaha's “I Stay Awake”: 
The candle has faded
So much so that I don’t see anything 
Burdened by the night, 
While it was still young 
It melted…

The Novel
Since Arabic was not taught or allowed in schools before the Algerian War, Algerian literature in Arabic before 1962 was sparse and mainly in short story format. Ahmed Reda Houhou wrote several acclaimed short stories in this period including his famous satire: In the Company of the Wise Man’s Donkey. In fact, until 1971, with the publishing of Abdelhamid ben Hadouga’s The South Wind, most Algerian Arabic literature was in short story format. Other notable works at this time include Tahar Ouettar's Laz (the Ace) in 1974 and A-Zilzel (The Earthquake) in 1976. The early 1970s Arabic novels focused primarily on the War for Independence and the transformation of Algerian society. By the 1980s, however, the themes of Algerian Arabic literature were largely similar to their French counterparts, discussing bureaucracy, religious intolerance and patriarchy. Moving into the 1990s, Algerian Arabic literature focused mainly on terrorism and the tragedy of what was called the Black Decade.

Oral Literature

Berber Oral Poetry
Traditional Oral literature in Berber existed since ancient times when the majority of the population was illiterate. This literature mainly included poems, called Isefra in Kabyle Berber. These poems were used for aspects of both religious and secular life. The religious poems included devotions, prophetic stories, and poems honoring saints. The secular poetry could be about celebrations like births and weddings as well as accounts of heroic warriors. These poems were often performed by traveling poets called Imaddahen Below is a short excerpt of a translated asefru poem showing religious themes: 
To whom should I complain? 
I have become insane…
Lord, I implore your help...  
This would be the first of three stanzas in the poem, each with three lines in an AAB AAB AAB rhyme pattern.

Women's Oral Poetry
More recently, oral poetry has become literature primarily created by women. These women's poems, part of a game or ceremony called Būqālah, also meaning ceramic pitcher, are usually four to ten lines in Algerian Arabic. While a number of these poems have now been transcribed in both Arabic and French, they would have been traditionally chanted in Būqālah ceremonies. The more traditional poems focused on love and sexuality, while more recent works around the 1950s and 60s instead discussed resisting French colonialism.
The following is an excerpt from a Būqālah poem used for the independence struggle that describes waiting for freedom: 
My heart full of worries is like a brazier 
where the half-burned logs each moment shoot off high flames 
be also patient, O my heart, until the olive under the press 
or the baby ostrich on whom the vulture pounces
or the dove captive in the cage who can watch
and is forbidden to go out…

See also
List of Algerian writers
List of Algerian women writers
Languages of Algeria
DZ-manga

References